His Best is a 1997 greatest hits compilation album by American rock and roll icon Bo Diddley released by Chess and MCA Records on April 8, 1997 (see 1997 in music). The album was re-released by Geffen Records on April 17, 2007 as The Definitive Collection with a different album cover. The Definitive Collection reached #2 on Billboard magazine's Blues Albums chart on June 21, 2008, which was the week that the album debuted on the charts.

Album background
As a greatest hits album, His Best features almost all of Bo Diddley's chart hits that appeared in The Billboard from 1955's "Bo Diddley" through 1967's "Ooh Baby" (except for "Say Man, Back Again"), although it excluded the UK hit "Hey Good Looking". The album features songs listed in chronological order by when the songs were recorded.

Track listing

Personnel
Per liner notes and Allmusic
Bo Diddley – vocals, guitar, violin, producer
Jerome Green – maracas, co-lead vocals, background vocals
Jody Williams – guitar on "I'm Looking for a Woman" and "Who Do You Love?"
Peggy Jones – guitar, background vocals
Ricky Jolivet – guitar
Lester Davenport – harmonica
Billy Boy Arnold – harmonica
Little Walter – harmonica on "Diddley Daddy"
Lafayette Leake – piano
Otis Spann – piano
Willie Dixon – bass
James Bradford – bass
Jesse James Johnson – bass
Chester Lindsey – bass
Clifton James – drums
Frank Kirkland – drums
Billy Downing – drums
Edell Robertson – drums
Eddie Drennon – electric violin on "Ooh Baby"
Cornelia Redmond – tambourine on "Ooh Baby"
Bobby Baskerville – background vocals
The Carnations – background vocals
Geary Chansley – photo research
The Flamingos – background vocals
Mike Fink – design on The Definitive Collection
Erick Labson – digital remastering
The Moonglows – background vocals
David Redfern – photography
Andy McKaie – reissue producer and compiler

References

Bo Diddley albums
Chess Records compilation albums
MCA Records compilation albums
Geffen Records compilation albums
Albums produced by Leonard Chess
Albums produced by Phil Chess
Albums produced by Bo Diddley
1997 compilation albums
2007 compilation albums
Rock compilation albums